MDMC, commonly called methylone, is an empathogen and stimulant psychoactive drug.

MDMC may also refer to:

 Material Data Management Consortium, see Materials data management
 MDMC/EDMA, a psychedelic drug first synthesized by Alexander Shulgin
 Osvaldo Virgil Airport (ICAO: MDMC), Monte CristiDominican Republic